Fagus chienii is a species of beech tree native to northern Sichuan in China. It was first formally named by Chinese botanist Wan Chun Cheng in 1935.

Flora of China notes that the taxonomic status of Fagus chienii is uncertain, as it is only known from the place it was collected (type locality), and is similar to Fagus lucida. The two species are distinguished by the "longer, recurved cupule bracts" in F. chienii.

References

chienii
Plants described in 1935
Endemic flora of China